Werner Beier (born 25 April 1936) is a German sports shooter. He competed in the men's 25 metre rapid fire pistol event at the 1976 Summer Olympics.

References

1936 births
Living people
German male sport shooters
Olympic shooters of West Germany
Shooters at the 1976 Summer Olympics
Sportspeople from Frankfurt